Adderstone is a village and former civil parish, now in the parish of Adderstone with Lucker, in the county of Northumberland, England. In 1951 the parish had a population of 185.

History 
The name "Adderstone" means 'Eadred's farm/settlement'. Adderstone was formerly a township in the parish of Bambrough, from 1866 Adderstone was a civil parish in its own right until it was abolished on 1 April 1955 to form Adderstone with Lucker.

Governance 
Adderstone is in the parliamentary constituency of Berwick-upon-Tweed.

References

External links

Villages in Northumberland
Former civil parishes in Northumberland